Duncan Lake – known as Amazay in Sekani– is a natural -long wilderness fish-bearing lake with rainbow trout and whitefish populations, located at the headwaters of the Findlay watershed. in the Omineca Mountains of the Northern Interior of British Columbia, Canada. The Finlay River

The Tse Keh Nay, formerly known as the Ingenika, live at the north end of the Williston Lake in the community of Tsay Keh Dene. They have lived in the Rocky Mountain Trench, also known as the Valley of a Thousand Peaks "for many generations." In 1824 Samuel Black (1780-1841), an early fur trader kept a journal describing his visited to the region with Tse Keh Nay Chief Methodiates and his followers. He described the historic use of the resource rich Amazay/Thutade/Kemess area.

Amazay Lake was the calving ground for caribou in the month of May.

See also
Google Earth Duncan Lake, Peace River, BC V0J 57° 2'19.64"N 126°47'45.16"W; Geo URI geo:57.966667,-126.783333

References

Northern Interior of British Columbia
Lakes of British Columbia
Omineca Mountains
Cassiar Land District